The Mills House and Smokehouse, located south of Griffin, Georgia at 1590 Carver Rd., is an Italianate-style house built in 1875 and its smokehouse.  It was listed on the National Register of Historic Places in 1980.

It is a two-story building,  in plan, with a low roof and wide eaves supported by decorative brackets.  It has an original one-story front porch.  The main part of the house is built of "a combination of heavy mortised and tenoned timbers and light dimensioned lumber fastened with cut nails. This structure is sheathed with weatherboards, painted white. The house was originally supported by brick piers; it now rests on a continuous brick foundation wall. Original wood shingles on the roof have been covered with large, diamond-shaped asphalt shingles."

References

National Register of Historic Places in Georgia (U.S. state)
Italianate architecture in Georgia (U.S. state)
Houses completed in 1875
Spalding County, Georgia
Smokehouses